Cartagena is a 2015 Spanish-language novel by Uruguayan writer Claudia Amengual.

Set in Montevideo and Cartagena de Indias, it tells the story of a journalist living his midlife crisis who takes wrong decisions with disastrous consequences. Thirty years later, he travels to Cartagena in search of a new opportunity. Notably, Colombian writer Gabriel García Márquez appears as an important character in the last pages. This novel constitutes a posthumous tribute to the Colombian Nobel-Prize winner.

Awards
 Premio Herralde 2014: Finalist (Editorial Anagrama).

References

2015 novels
Uruguayan novels
Spanish-language novels
Novels set in Uruguay
Novels set in Colombia
Novels about midlife crisis
Cartagena, Colombia
Gabriel García Márquez
Alfaguara books